Raymond Kirk Scriven (9 January 1912 – 28 May 1994) was an Australian rules footballer who played with Richmond in the Victorian Football League (VFL).

A wingman, Scriven came to Richmond via Newport and the Fitzroy Reserves. After his time with Richmond, Scriven moved to Coburg and then Brunswick in the Victorian Football Association.

Scriven subsequently served in the Australian Army during World War II.

Notes

External links 

Ray Scriven's playing statistics from The VFA Project

1912 births
1994 deaths
Australian rules footballers from Melbourne
Richmond Football Club players
Coburg Football Club players
Brunswick Football Club players
Australian Army personnel of World War II
Military personnel from Melbourne
People from Newport, Victoria